Imran Arif (born 15 January 1984) is a Pakistani-born British first-class cricketer. A fast-medium bowler, he played for Worcestershire County Cricket Club.

He played in the second XI for Sussex during the 2007 season before moving to Worcestershire, where he played five second XI matches before earning a place in the first team, making his first-class debut against Glamorgan in July 2008, where he took seven wickets in the match, including 5/50 in the first innings as Worcestershire won by ten wickets.

He signed for Worcestershire as an overseas player, and a new two-year contract with Worcestershire could not be completed until he received a British passport. By 2009 he had lived in the UK for eight years, but did not hold a UK passport. He was granted this in March 2009, and Worcestershire's Director of Cricket Steve Rhodes told the Worcester News that Arif had "a wonderful talent". He added: "if he bowls like he did last year we will be very impressed."

In 2009 Arif was allocated to Kidderminster Victoria Cricket Club by Worcestershire.

Arif was released by Worcestershire at the end of the 2010 season having failed to hold down a first-team place in 2009 or 2010.

Notes

1984 births
Living people
English people of Azad Kashmiri descent
English cricketers
Pakistani cricketers
Worcestershire cricketers
English people of Pakistani descent
Pakistani emigrants to the United Kingdom
Naturalised citizens of the United Kingdom
People from Kotli District
British Asian cricketers
British sportspeople of Pakistani descent